Mirrors (Al-Maraya) is Naguib Mahfouz's 1972 novel. In it, Mahfouz creates portraits of the characters. The novel does not parallel the traditional Arabic novel, for it focuses on the characters instead of the plot in an attempt to create artistic images of people who were actual contemporaries of Mahfouz. He does this by shedding the light on the secretive and known aspects of the characters' lives and closely connecting them to the plot and the plot's effect on their lives. Additionally, Mahfouz incorporates his own opinions on these characters and the political eras they lived through.

Summary 
The novel includes 55 characters. The reader initially thinks that they are all fictional; however, after closely reading they realize that they are all real characters stripped off their names and appearances. Most of these characters were contemporaries of Mahfouz. The 55 characters include: The professor, embodying the thinker who does not belong to any cause or anyone other than himself, the other character contradicts the first character in that it is the thinker who remains principled with time, no matter the hardships he faces. It also includes the thug who relies on violence, the nationalist who grieves over the failure of the delegation with the departure of Makram Ebeid and Al-Naqrashi from the party, the student who was martyred in Cairo's streets defending Egypt's 1923 constitution, which was discontinued by Ismaʿil Ṣidqi, the imprudent woman who cheats on her husband with his friend, the woman searching for true love despite being in her 70s with a husband and kids, the revolutionary who's a member of the Free Officers Movement, the thinker who died fighting police officers whilst getting arrested, whose legend persists after his death, the sex-obsessed woman, the tough communist who only knows honesty and rigidness, the beautiful communist plastic artist, the trader who only trades in what is forbidden, and the pious religious character. The 55 characters make up an elaborate portrait, allowing the reader to form opinions on these characters, and the vast difference between each character aids in and increases the importance of forming these opinions.

On the novel 
Many critics believe that the importance of Mahfouz's "Mirrors" lies in the way it presents and critiques the "Thinkers" in Egypt, which was one of the most important social classes in Egypt during the 20th century. Also, Mahfouz's works, in general, and 'Mirrors,' in particular, led to the development of what is known as ('Adab Al-Talsin) or (Gossip Literature), which is a term coined by the critic Faruq Abdelkadir to describe a literary style used by authors to settle personal matters with their enemies. Hence, 'Mirrors' is a clear example of this literary style.

References 

Egyptian novelists
Egyptian Nobel laureates
1972 novels
Egyptian novels
Egyptian literature
Arabic literature